Fred August Enke (July 12, 1897 – November 2, 1985) was an American football and basketball player, coach of football, basketball, baseball, and golf, and college athletics administrator. The Rochester, Minnesota native coached basketball for two seasons at the University of Louisville (1923–1925) and 36 seasons at the University of Arizona (1925–1961), compiling a career college basketball record of 522–344 (.603). Enke also spent two seasons as head football coach at Louisville (1923–1924) and one season as the head football coach at Arizona (1931), tallying a career college football mark of 11–13–2. In addition, he was the head baseball coach at Louisville for two seasons (1924–1925) and the school's athletic director from 1923 to 1925. Enke's son, Fred William Enke, played seven seasons in the National Football League (NFL).

According to historian David Leighton, the street Enke Drive, on the University of Arizona campus is named in honor of Fred A. Enke. There is also the Fred Enke golf course in far eastern Tucson.

Head coaching record

Football

Basketball

References

External links
  David Leighton, "Street Smarts: Local sports legend has street, golf course named after him," Arizona Daily Star, June 10,2014
 

1897 births
1985 deaths
American football tackles
American men's basketball coaches
American men's basketball players
Arizona Wildcats football coaches
Basketball coaches from Minnesota
Basketball players from Minnesota
Arizona Wildcats men's basketball coaches
College golf coaches in the United States
Louisville Cardinals athletic directors
Louisville Cardinals baseball coaches
Louisville Cardinals football coaches
Louisville Cardinals men's basketball coaches
Minnesota Golden Gophers football players
Minnesota Golden Gophers men's basketball players
People from Casa Grande, Arizona
Players of American football from Minnesota
South Dakota State Jackrabbits football coaches
Sportspeople from Rochester, Minnesota
Sportspeople from the Phoenix metropolitan area